Cryphia moeonis is a moth of the family Noctuidae. It is found in the Near East and Middle East, mainly in steppes and semi-deserts. In the Levant it is found in Jordan and Israel.

Adults are on wing from June to August. There is one generation per year.

The larvae probably feed on lichen.

External links
The Acronictinae, Bryophilinae, Hypenodinae and Hypeninae of Israel

Cryphia
Moths of the Middle East
Moths described in 1865